Barbie: It Takes Two is a CGI-animated adventure comedy children's television series serving as the television adaptation of and based on the 2021 streaming television film, Barbie: Big City, Big Dreams.

Unveiled by Mattel Television on 1 February 2022 on its website and later picked up by news sources, this is the second full-length TV series in the Barbie media franchise after Barbie: Dreamhouse Adventures.

Background
On 1 February 2022, Mattel Television unveiled an initial 13-episode CGI-animated television adaptation of the film titled Barbie: It Takes Two. Executives of Barbie: Big City, Big Dreams as well as Mainframe Studios reprise their roles in the series with the inclusion of Marsha Griffin (who previously wrote scripts for 3 Barbie films between 2015 and 2016 in Barbie in Princess Power, Barbie in Rock 'N Royals and Barbie: Spy Squad) as a creative producer.

Premise
Following on from the end of their screen debut in Barbie: Big City, Big Dreams, the Barbie from Malibu and Barbie from Brooklyn have fun, share the spotlight and pursue their musical dreams in New York City while also learning about each other's polar opposite families, friends and cultures.

Characters

Main
America Young as Barbie "Malibu" Roberts
Tatiana Varria as Barbie "Brooklyn" Roberts
Nicolas Roye as Rafael/Rafa

Recurring
Gabriel "Gabe" Kunda as Kelvin "Kel" Roberts, father of Barbie "Brooklyn" Roberts
Mela Lee as Simone Roberts, mother of Barbie "Brooklyn" Roberts
Xavier Patterson as Jackson Roberts, godson of Barbie "Brooklyn" Roberts
Taylor Lauren as Jayla Roberts, goddaughter of Barbie "Brooklyn" Roberts
Nicolas Roye as Male Teacher at the Handler Arts Academy

Guest vocals
Ritesh Rajan as Ken Carson
Kirsten Day as Skipper Roberts
Cassandra Morris as Stacie Roberts
Cassidy Naber (episodes 1-13) & Anna McGill (episodes 14-26) as Chelsea Roberts
Greg Chun as George Roberts, father of Barbie "Malibu" Roberts
Lisa Fuson as Margaret Roberts, mother of Barbie "Malibu" Roberts, and Poppy Reardon, an antagonistic neighbor.
Cristina Milizia as Teresa
Desirae Whitfield as Nicole "Nikki" Watkins
Stephanie Sheh as Renee
Emma Galvin as Daisy
Jason Marsden as Magnifico
Yuri Lowenthal as Stefan and Wilhelm
Christopher Niosi as Dash
Dorian Plague as Epiphany
Elise Gabriel as Lyla, Meditation Guide
Aleks Le as James
Melanie Minichino as Vanessa and Phoebe
Petey Gibson as Tyler
Ricky Bricks as Larry Herron
Max Mitchell as Big Base
Xavier Patterson as Jackson
Jason Williams as Emmitt
Robbie Daymond as Paul
Cassidy Huff as Emma
Billy Kametz as Trevelian Finknoddle "Trey" Reardon, Poppy and Whittaker's only son
Giselle Fernandez as Emmie
Conor Hall as Bertram
Nicolas Roye as Mateo
Sarah H. Fairbrook as Pandora

Broadcast
The series debuted on television in Australia via 9GO! on March 4 and on Pop in the UK and Ireland on April 2 before launching on April 8 on Netflix in the United States. On April 10, it aired on YTV in Canada and on Canal Panda in Portugal the exact week later. Mattel later revealed through TheWrap the second half of 13 episodes would be released on 1 October on Netflix.

Episodes

Season 1 (8 April 2022)
The table below shows only the titles and episode summaries from the American Netflix release. More will be added in due time.

Season 2 (1 October 2022)

We've Got Magic to Do
Cut it Out
Studio Sleuths
For the Record
Knock it Off
Costumed Capers
Cupid Shuffle
Team No Screens
Festival Fiasco
Buddy's is Booming
To Dye For
Game On!
Race to the Finish

References

External links
 Production website
 Barbie: It Takes Two on Netflix
 
 Barbie: It Takes Two'' on Common Sense Media

Barbie television series
Netflix children's programming
2020s American animated television series
2022 American television series debuts
2020s Canadian animated television series
2022 Canadian television series debuts
American children's animated comedy television series
American computer-animated television series
Canadian children's animated comedy television series
Canadian computer-animated television series
English-language Netflix original programming
Television shows set in California
Television shows set in New York City
Television shows set in Malibu, California
Television shows set in Brooklyn
Television series by Mattel Creations